Metro Station is the debut studio album by American pop rock band Metro Station. The album was released on September 18, 2007, under Columbia/Red Ink. Four singles were released from the album; "Kelsey", "Control", "Shake It" and "Seventeen Forever". The group completed recording the album in July 2007.

The album was released in the UK on March 30, 2009. The version of the album released in the UK contains 2 exclusive bonus tracks including a brand new track, "After the Fall". The first UK single, "Shake It", was released a week before, on March 23, 2009.

Singles
"Kelsey" was released as the first single on August 7, 2007. The song peaked at number 25 in New Zealand and at number 1 on the Billboard Dance Singles Sales chart.

The second single, "Control", was released on December 17, 2007 but saw no commercial success. The song was released in the UK in the spring of 2009.

"Shake It" was released as the third single from the album and was serviced to contemporary hit radio on April 1, 2008. The song peaked at number 10 on the Billboard Hot 100 and reached the top 10 in multiple country charts including Canada, Australia and the UK. The single has sold 1.2 million copies and is certified 2× Platinum in the US.

The fourth and final single "Seventeen Forever" was released on December 13, 2008. It peaked at number 42 on the Billboard Hot 100 and is certified gold in the US.

Critical reception

The album was received with relatively low reviews as Andrew Leahey from AllMusic gave the album a 2.5 out of 5 star rating. Criticizing the album, he stated, "not much exists beneath the polished sheen of teenaged lyrics and electronica-lite." However, he praised keyboardist Blake Healy's work as he remarked, "he is the band's secret weapon, supporting his two frontmen with enough bubbling synth to keep the ship float." NME gave the album a 2 out of 5 star rating, complimenting songs such as "Shake It" and "California" calling them "standout moments." 

Joe DeAndrea of AbsolutePunk gave a more positive review stating, "This album proves that this isn't just a band that'll write one popular song and disappear from the scene in a couple of years. They have talent, they're young, and they'll keep getting better." DeAndrea also compared the group to Panic! at the Disco for their abiltiy at "writing fun, catchy tunes."

Commercial performance
The album debuted at number 189 on the US Billboard 200 and reached number 39 as its highest position on chart. The album also peaked at number one on the Top Dance/Electronic Albums chart. The album made it on the Billboard 200 year-end chart at number 182 in 2008 and the Top Dance/Electronic Albums year-end chart at number 2. That same year, the album sold 87,000 copies. Since, it has sold approximately 400,000 copies in the United States.

Track listing

Personnel
Credits for Metro Station adapted from AllMusic.

Metro Station
 Trace Cyrus – lead guitar, vocals
 Blake Healy – synthesizer, beats
 Anthony Improgo – drums
 Mason Musso – vocals, rhythm guitar

Additional musicians
 Joshua Cain – bass, guitar
 Ghost of Harlem – bass
 Sean Gould – guitar
 Justin Pierre – guitar, backing vocals 

Production
 Ed Ackerson – engineer
 Arjun Agerwala – engineer
 Will Brierre – assistant engineer
 Joshua Cain – producer
 Julian Gilbert – photography
 Sean Gould – engineer
 Matt Govaere – art direction
 Blake Healy - programming
 Sam Hollander - composer
 Maureen Kenny - A&R
 Mark Needham - mixing
 Justin Pierre - producer
 Scott Riebling - engineer
 S*A*M and Sluggo - producer

Charts

Weekly charts

Year-end charts

Certifications

Release history

References

2007 debut albums
Metro Station (band) albums
Columbia Records albums
Albums produced by S*A*M and Sluggo